Alcindor is a surname. Notable people with the name include:

 Aurelie Alcindor (born 1994), Mauritian sprinter
 Barbara Alcindor, French singer and lead singer of the pop band French Affair
 John Alcindor (1873–1924), Trinidadian physician
 Lew Alcindor or Kareem Abdul-Jabbar (born 1947), American basketball player
 Minnie Martin Alcindor (1879–1961), British pan-Africanist 
 Regina Alcindor, Seychellois assemblywoman	
 Yamiche Alcindor (born 1986), American journalist